The Gettysburg Lincoln Railroad Station, also known as the "Gettysburg Train Station," "Lincoln Train Station" or "Western Maryland Railroad Station," is a historic train station with depot, platform, museum and offices on Carlisle Street in Gettysburg, Pennsylvania. Operable from 1858 to 1942, it contributes to the Gettysburg Battlefield Historic District and is most notable as President Abraham Lincoln's point of arrival on November 18, 1863 and departure, following delivery of the Gettysburg Address. The station served as both a hospital during the battle and hub for outgoing wounded soldiers and incoming resources and supplies following the end of the war. On 2015, following several years of delays, the station, which was originally owned by the Borough of Gettysburg but was bought by the Gettysburg Foundation, the non-profit partner to the National Park Service, was placed under the purview of the National Park Service.

History
After an uncompleted 1830s plan for a railroad through Gettysburg, on December 1, 1858, the Gettysburg Railroad line was completed from the east to Gettysburg with a reception for railroad dignitaries held several days later at "a large and recently furnished building near the depot" (the depot was being built on  purchased from George W McClellan in the summer). The Gettysburg Railroad Company had contracted for Passenger Depot construction on September 18, 1858 for "the Corner of Carlisle and Railroad street"; and on January 10, 1859, the stockholders resolved to hold their future meetings "in the office [of] their Passenger Depot".

American Civil War
Train service to the depot was stopped when Jubal Early's Confederates burned the Rock Creek trestle on June 27, 1863. The station was undamaged during the battle and returned to service in 1865 following the end of evacuation of the wounded or dead and repairs to the lines.

The station was used as a hospital, and soldiers used the station's cupola during the battle. A station east of the borough was established for Camp Letterman before rail traffic was restored to the depot on July 10, and by the end of July, nearly 15,000 wounded troops had passed through the station via the twice-daily trains. A medical inspector of the Army arrived on July 8 and used the depot while "in immediate charge of the transportation of the wounded".

Heroine of the station
As the Confederate forces approached the town the depot's telegrapher, the adopted young daughter of a "Mr. (Brown) Lee in Washington  Pa.", evacuated the station on the at the beginning of the battle and "took the machine from the operating table [and] connected the wires so as to preserve the circuit intact and carried the instrument to Cemetery Hill" where, after instructing soldiers how to connect to the wires (e.g., along the Baltimore Pike), she used the key to relay Union Army information. The girl remained during the duration of the battle, even when the soldiers around her were felled by bullets and shells. Following the end of the battle, she packed up the machine and returned to the station to resume her work. Her name was unknown during and after the battle and a news article 30 years later attempted to identify the young girl.

Gettysburg Address
For the consecration of the National Cemetery at Gettysburg on November 19, 1863, President Abraham Lincoln arrived at 6:00 p.m. on the 18th and departed 24 hours later, having delivered the Gettysburg Address.

Postbellum
Commercial telegraph service in the depot began in 1866, (L. D. Plank replaced Charles T. Rose as the 1902 Western Union Telegraph operator in the "W. U. office") and the station's railroad line became part of the successor lines: Susquehanna, Gettysburg and Potomac Railway (1870), Hanover Junction, Hanover and Gettysburg Railroad (1874), Baltimore and Harrisburg Railway (1885), and Western Maryland Railway (1917).  The last passenger train departed the depot at 4:00 p.m. on December 31, 1942, when the depot's passenger service was discontinued. (scheduled Reading passenger service had ended in 1941).  The depot was used until 1948 for administration of freight trains and telegraphy. On April 1, 1955, Western Maryland leased the building to the Gettysburg Travel Council (CSX Transportation owned the station in 1987).

Renovation
Following a 1996 meeting regarding the station's condition (the station was near collapse), renovation was funded. The Borough of Gettysburg acquired the property on May 6, 1998; the Gettysburg Convention and Visitors' Bureau vacated the depot in 2002; and renovation began in January 2005 (completed 2006).  The Pennsylvania Abraham Lincoln Bicentennial Commission was "pivotal in the grand re-opening of the Historic Gettysburg Train Station" on the 2006 anniversary of Lincoln's arrival. The borough approved a 2007 2nd floor lease for the Gettysburg International Arts Festival, and the station has been operated by the National Trust for Historic Gettysburg since 2008. In 2010,  by Todd Platts failed in the US Senate for allowing Gettysburg National Military Park acquisition of the depot.

Gettysburg railroad museum
The depot's first floor is a museum with an information counter and is open daily (free) to the public. The museum contains models, diagrams, exhibits, and artifacts which were found during the renovation of the station.

References

External links 
 Official website (Gettysburg Foundation)

Gettysburg, Pennsylvania
Italianate architecture in Pennsylvania
Museums in Adams County, Pennsylvania
Railroad museums in Pennsylvania
Railway stations in the United States opened in 1859
Railway stations closed in 1942
Former Western Maryland Railway stations
American Civil War hospitals
Historic district contributing properties in Pennsylvania
National Register of Historic Places in Adams County, Pennsylvania
Transportation buildings and structures in Adams County, Pennsylvania
Repurposed railway stations in the United States
Former railway stations in Pennsylvania